The following timeline of algorithms outlines the development of algorithms (mainly "mathematical recipes") since their inception.

Medieval Period
 Before – writing about "recipes" (on cooking, rituals, agriculture and other themes)
 c. 1700–2000 BC – Egyptians develop earliest known algorithms for multiplying two numbers
 c. 1600 BC – Babylonians develop earliest known algorithms for factorization and finding square roots
 c. 300 BC – Euclid's algorithm
 c. 200 BC – the Sieve of Eratosthenes
 263 AD – Gaussian elimination described by Liu Hui
 628 – Chakravala method described by Brahmagupta
 c. 820 – Al-Khawarizmi described algorithms for solving linear equations and quadratic equations in his Algebra; the word algorithm comes from his name
 825 – Al-Khawarizmi described the algorism, algorithms for using the Hindu–Arabic numeral system, in his treatise On the Calculation with Hindu Numerals, which was translated into Latin as Algoritmi de numero Indorum, where "Algoritmi", the translator's rendition of the author's name gave rise to the word algorithm (Latin algorithmus) with a meaning "calculation method"
 c. 850 – cryptanalysis and frequency analysis algorithms developed by Al-Kindi (Alkindus) in A Manuscript on Deciphering Cryptographic Messages, which contains algorithms on breaking encryptions and ciphers
 c. 1025 – Ibn al-Haytham (Alhazen), was the first mathematician to derive the formula for the sum of the fourth powers, and in turn, he develops an algorithm for determining the general formula for the sum of any integral powers, which was fundamental to the development of integral calculus
 c. 1400 – Ahmad al-Qalqashandi gives a list of ciphers in his Subh al-a'sha which include both substitution and transposition, and for the first time, a cipher with multiple substitutions for each plaintext letter; he also gives an exposition on and worked example of cryptanalysis, including the use of tables of letter frequencies and sets of letters which can not occur together in one word

Before 1940
 1540 – Lodovico Ferrari discovered a method to find the roots of a quartic polynomial
 1545 – Gerolamo Cardano published Cardano's method for finding the roots of a cubic polynomial
 1614 – John Napier develops method for performing calculations using logarithms
 1671 – Newton–Raphson method developed by Isaac Newton
 1690 – Newton–Raphson method independently developed by Joseph Raphson
 1706 – John Machin develops a quickly converging inverse-tangent series for π and computes π to 100 decimal places
 1789 – Jurij Vega improves Machin's formula and computes π to 140 decimal places,

 1805 – FFT-like algorithm known by Carl Friedrich Gauss
 1842 – Ada Lovelace writes the first algorithm for a computing engine
 1903 – A fast Fourier transform algorithm presented by Carle David Tolmé Runge
 1926 – Borůvka's algorithm
 1926 – Primary decomposition algorithm presented by Grete Hermann
 1927 – Hartree–Fock method developed for simulating a quantum many-body system in a stationary state.
 1934 – Delaunay triangulation developed by Boris Delaunay
 1936 – Turing machine, an abstract machine developed by Alan Turing, with others developed the modern notion of algorithm.

1940s
 1942 – A fast Fourier transform algorithm developed by G.C. Danielson and Cornelius Lanczos
 1945 – Merge sort developed by John von Neumann
 1947 – Simplex algorithm developed by George Dantzig

1950s
 1952 – Huffman coding developed by David A. Huffman
 1953 – Simulated annealing introduced by Nicholas Metropolis
 1954 – Radix sort computer algorithm developed by Harold H. Seward
 1964 – Box–Muller transform for fast generation of normally distributed numbers published by George Edward Pelham Box and Mervin Edgar Muller. Independently pre-discovered by Raymond E. A. C. Paley and Norbert Wiener in 1934.
 1956 – Kruskal's algorithm developed by Joseph Kruskal
 1956 – Ford–Fulkerson algorithm developed and published by R. Ford Jr. and D. R. Fulkerson
 1957 – Prim's algorithm developed by Robert Prim
 1957 – Bellman–Ford algorithm developed by Richard E. Bellman and L. R. Ford, Jr.
 1959 – Dijkstra's algorithm developed by Edsger Dijkstra
 1959 – Shell sort developed by Donald L. Shell
 1959 – De Casteljau's algorithm developed by Paul de Casteljau
 1959 – QR factorization algorithm developed independently by John G.F. Francis and Vera Kublanovskaya
 1959 – Rabin–Scott powerset construction for converting NFA into DFA published by Michael O. Rabin and Dana Scott

1960s
 1960 – Karatsuba multiplication
 1961 – CRC (Cyclic redundancy check) invented by W. Wesley Peterson
 1962 – AVL trees
 1962 – Quicksort developed by C. A. R. Hoare
 1962 – Bresenham's line algorithm developed by Jack E. Bresenham
 1962 – Gale–Shapley 'stable-marriage' algorithm developed by David Gale and Lloyd Shapley
 1964 – Heapsort developed by J. W. J. Williams
 1964 – multigrid methods first proposed by R. P. Fedorenko
 1965 – Cooley–Tukey algorithm rediscovered by James Cooley and John Tukey
 1965 – Levenshtein distance developed by Vladimir Levenshtein
 1965 – Cocke–Younger–Kasami (CYK) algorithm independently developed by Tadao Kasami
 1965 – Buchberger's algorithm for computing Gröbner bases developed by Bruno Buchberger
 1965 – LR parsers invented by Donald Knuth
 1966 – Dantzig algorithm for shortest path in a graph with negative edges
 1967 – Viterbi algorithm proposed by Andrew Viterbi
 1967 – Cocke–Younger–Kasami (CYK) algorithm independently developed by Daniel H. Younger
 1968 – A* graph search algorithm described by Peter Hart, Nils Nilsson, and Bertram Raphael
 1968 – Risch algorithm for indefinite integration developed by Robert Henry Risch
 1969 – Strassen algorithm for matrix multiplication developed by Volker Strassen

1970s
 1970 – Dinic's algorithm for computing maximum flow in a flow network by Yefim (Chaim) A. Dinitz
 1970 – Knuth–Bendix completion algorithm developed by Donald Knuth and Peter B. Bendix
 1970 – BFGS method of the quasi-Newton class
 1970 – Needleman–Wunsch algorithm published by Saul B. Needleman and Christian D. Wunsch
 1972 – Edmonds–Karp algorithm published by Jack Edmonds and Richard Karp, essentially identical to Dinic's algorithm from 1970
 1972 – Graham scan developed by Ronald Graham
 1972 – Red–black trees and B-trees discovered
 1973 – RSA encryption algorithm discovered by Clifford Cocks
 1973 – Jarvis march algorithm developed by R. A. Jarvis
 1973 – Hopcroft–Karp algorithm developed by John Hopcroft and Richard Karp
 1974 – Pollard's p − 1 algorithm developed by John Pollard
 1974 – Quadtree developed by Raphael Finkel and J.L. Bentley
 1975 – Genetic algorithms popularized by John Holland
 1975 – Pollard's rho algorithm developed by John Pollard
 1975 – Aho–Corasick string matching algorithm developed by Alfred V. Aho and Margaret J. Corasick
 1975 – Cylindrical algebraic decomposition developed by George E. Collins
 1976 – Salamin–Brent algorithm independently discovered by Eugene Salamin and Richard Brent
 1976 – Knuth–Morris–Pratt algorithm developed by Donald Knuth and Vaughan Pratt and independently by J. H. Morris
 1977 – Boyer–Moore string-search algorithm for searching the occurrence of a string into another string.
 1977 – RSA encryption algorithm rediscovered by Ron Rivest, Adi Shamir, and Len Adleman
 1977 – LZ77 algorithm developed by Abraham Lempel and Jacob Ziv
 1977 – multigrid methods developed independently by Achi Brandt and Wolfgang Hackbusch
 1978 – LZ78 algorithm developed from LZ77 by Abraham Lempel and Jacob Ziv
 1978 – Bruun's algorithm proposed for powers of two by Georg Bruun
 1979 – Khachiyan's ellipsoid method developed by Leonid Khachiyan
 1979 – ID3 decision tree algorithm developed by Ross Quinlan

1980s
 1980 – Brent's Algorithm for cycle detection Richard P. Brendt
 1981 – Quadratic sieve developed by Carl Pomerance
 1981 – Smith–Waterman algorithm developed by Temple F. Smith and Michael S. Waterman
 1983 – Simulated annealing developed by S. Kirkpatrick, C. D. Gelatt and M. P. Vecchi
 1983 – Classification and regression tree (CART) algorithm developed by Leo Breiman, et al.
 1984 – LZW algorithm developed from LZ78 by Terry Welch
 1984 – Karmarkar's interior-point algorithm developed by Narendra Karmarkar
 1984 - ACORN PRNG discovered by Roy Wikramaratna and used privately 
 1985 – Simulated annealing independently developed by V. Cerny
 1985 - Car–Parrinello molecular dynamics developed by Roberto Car and Michele Parrinello
 1985 – Splay trees discovered by Sleator and Tarjan
 1986 – Blum Blum Shub proposed by L. Blum, M. Blum, and M. Shub
 1986 – Push relabel maximum flow algorithm by Andrew Goldberg and Robert Tarjan
 1986 - Barnes–Hut tree method developed by Josh Barnes and Piet Hut for fast approximate simulation of n-body problems
 1987 – Fast multipole method developed by Leslie Greengard and Vladimir Rokhlin
 1988 – Special number field sieve developed by John Pollard
 1989 - ACORN PRNG published by Roy Wikramaratna
 1989 – Paxos protocol developed by Leslie Lamport

1990s
 1990 – General number field sieve developed from SNFS by Carl Pomerance, Joe Buhler, Hendrik Lenstra, and Leonard Adleman
 1990 – Coppersmith–Winograd algorithm developed by Don Coppersmith and Shmuel Winograd
 1990 – BLAST algorithm developed by Stephen Altschul, Warren Gish, Webb Miller, Eugene Myers, and David J. Lipman from National Institutes of Health
 1991 – Wait-free synchronization developed by Maurice Herlihy
 1992 – Deutsch–Jozsa algorithm proposed by D. Deutsch and Richard Jozsa
 1992 – C4.5 algorithm, a descendant of ID3 decision tree algorithm, was developed by Ross Quinlan
 1993 – Apriori algorithm developed by Rakesh Agrawal and Ramakrishnan Srikant
 1993 – Karger's algorithm to compute the minimum cut of a connected graph by David Karger
 1994 – Shor's algorithm developed by Peter Shor
 1994 – Burrows–Wheeler transform developed by Michael Burrows and David Wheeler
 1994 – Bootstrap aggregating (bagging) developed by Leo Breiman
 1995 – AdaBoost algorithm, the first practical boosting algorithm, was introduced by Yoav Freund and Robert Schapire
 1995 – soft-margin support vector machine algorithm was published by Vladimir Vapnik and Corinna Cortes. It adds a soft-margin idea to the 1992 algorithm by Boser, Nguyon, Vapnik, and is the algorithm that people usually refer to when saying SVM
 1995 – Ukkonen's algorithm for construction of suffix trees
 1996 – Bruun's algorithm generalized to arbitrary even composite sizes by H. Murakami
 1996 – Grover's algorithm developed by Lov K. Grover
 1996 – RIPEMD-160 developed by Hans Dobbertin, Antoon Bosselaers, and Bart Preneel
 1997 – Mersenne Twister a pseudo random number generator developed by Makoto Matsumoto and Tajuki Nishimura
 1998 – PageRank algorithm was published by Larry Page
 1998 – rsync algorithm developed by Andrew Tridgell
 1999 – gradient boosting algorithm developed by Jerome H. Friedman
 1999 – Yarrow algorithm designed by Bruce Schneier, John Kelsey, and Niels Ferguson

2000s
 2000 – Hyperlink-induced topic search a hyperlink analysis algorithm developed by Jon Kleinberg
 2001 – Lempel–Ziv–Markov chain algorithm for compression developed by Igor Pavlov
 2001 – Viola–Jones algorithm for real-time face detection was developed by Paul Viola and Michael Jones.
 2001 – DHT (Distributed hash table) is invented by multiple people from academia and application systems
 2001 – BitTorrent a first fully decentralized peer-to-peer file distribution system is published
 2001 – LOBPCG Locally Optimal Block Preconditioned Conjugate Gradient method finding extreme eigenvalues of symmetric eigenvalue problems by Andrew Knyazev 
 2002 – AKS primality test developed by Manindra Agrawal, Neeraj Kayal and Nitin Saxena
 2002 – Girvan–Newman algorithm to detect communities in complex systems
 2002 – Packrat parser developed for generating a parser that parses PEG (Parsing expression grammar) in linear time parsing developed by Bryan Ford
 2009 – Bitcoin a first trust-less decentralized cryptocurrency system is published

2010s
 2013 – Raft consensus protocol published by Diego Ongaro and John Ousterhout
 2015 – YOLO (“You Only Look Once”) is an effective real-time object recognition algorithm, first described by Joseph Redmon et al.

References

Algorithms
Algorithms
Algorithms